Trisobbio is a comune (municipality) in the Province of Alessandria in the Italian region Piedmont, located about  southeast of Turin and about  south of Alessandria.

Trisobbio borders the following municipalities: Carpeneto, Cremolino, Montaldo Bormida, Morsasco, Orsara Bormida, Ovada, and Rocca Grimalda.

Main sights
Castle, existing from as early as the 13th century
Parish church of Nostra Signora Assunta, known from the late 14th century
Communal Palace, of medieval origins

References

Cities and towns in Piedmont